Ian Hardman (born ) is an English professional rugby league footballer who plays for Featherstone Rovers in the Betfred Championship.

He has played for St. Helens, Hull Kingston Rovers, Widnes, and (captain) (Heritage № 921).

Background
Hardman was born in Whiston, Merseyside, England.

Club career
Ian Hardman was a try scorer in the England Under-17s win over the Australian Institute of sport side in December 2003. He made his début for St. Helens against Castleford on 15 August 2003 and made 46 appearances for St. Helens in total, scoring 15 tries, 11 goals and 8 drop goals. During the 2007 season, first-team chances at St. Helens were limited so Ian was loaned to Hull Kingston Rovers, he was instrumental in keeping them in Super League in their first season, making 18 consecutive appearances. He returned to St. Helens, only to be signed by Widnes on a season long loan.

Testimonial match
Ian Hardman's benefit season/testimonial match at Featherstone Rovers, allocated by the Rugby Football League, took place during the 2016 season.

References

External links
(archived by web.archive.org) Featherstone Rovers profile
(archived by web.archive.org) Profile at featherstonerovers.net
Profile at saints.org.uk
(archived by web.archive.org) Cup Squad Named
(archived by web.archive.org) Saints Rout Rovers
St Helens trio sign new contracts
Anderson wary of in-form Yeaman
Injury after injury
St Helens 34-27 Bradford
Salford 10-12 St Helens
Search for "Ian Hardman" at bbc.co.uk

1985 births
Living people
English rugby league players
Featherstone Rovers players
Hull Kingston Rovers players
People from Whiston, Merseyside
Rugby league fullbacks
Rugby league centres
Rugby league players from St Helens, Merseyside
Rugby league wingers
St Helens R.F.C. players
Widnes Vikings players